Weekend Nation may refer to:

In newspapers:
 Weekend Nation, the Friday edition of The Daily Nation (Barbados)
 Weekend Nation, the weekend edition of The Nation (Malawi)
 Weekend Nation, the weekend edition of the Seychelles Nation
 Weekend Nation, the weekend edition of The Nation (Sri Lanka)